Joseph Daniel Nault (August 19, 1888 – March 18, 1954) was an Ontario political figure. He represented Russell in the Legislative Assembly of Ontario as a Progressive Conservative from 1948 to 1954.

He was born in Ottawa, Ontario in 1888, the son of Georges Nault. In 1912, he married Alice Charlebois; in 1924, he married Antonia Parisien after the death of his first wife. Nault died in office in 1954.

References 
 Histoire des Comtes Unis de Prescott et de Russell, L. Brault (1963)

External links 
 

1888 births
1954 deaths
Progressive Conservative Party of Ontario MPPs
Politicians from Ottawa
Franco-Ontarian people